Michael Packer may refer to:

 Mick Packer (born 1950), English footballer
 Mike Packer, English dramatist, actor and poet

See also
 Michael Pacher (c. 1435 – 1498), Austrian painter and sculptor
 Michael Packe (1916–1978), English historian, biographer and cricketer